The 46th German Skeleton Championship in 2012 was held on 31 December 2011 in Winterberg.

Men 

22 athletes were on the start.

Women 

12 athletes were on the start.

External links 
 Skeleton: Jaqueline Lölling und Alexander Gassner holen DM-Titel Deutsche Meisterschaften Skeleton in Winterberg (German)
 Men's results
 Women's results

Skeleton championships in Germany
2012 in German sport
2012 in skeleton